Karol Mackiewicz (born 1 June 1992) is a Polish footballer who plays as a left winger for Olimpia Zambrów.

Career

Ruch Wysokie Mazowieckie
Leaving Górnik Łęczna in December 2019, Mackiewicz began training with Ruch Wysokie Mazowieckie in the beginning of February 2020. Later on the month, he signed a deal with the club.

References

External links
 
 

1992 births
Living people
Association football midfielders
Polish footballers
Ekstraklasa players
I liga players
II liga players
III liga players
Jagiellonia Białystok players
Wigry Suwałki players
Górnik Łęczna players
Ruch Wysokie Mazowieckie players
Olimpia Zambrów players
Sportspeople from Białystok